Johanna von Koczian (née von Kóczián-Miskolczy, born 30 October 1933) is a German actress. She grew up in Salzburg, Austria, where actor Gustaf Gründgens offered her a role at the Salzburg Festival. She later portrayed Anne Frank at the Schiller theater in Berlin, but her breakthrough in cinema was her role in the 1957 remake of Victor and Victoria. She has appeared in 60 films and television shows since 1955. She starred in the film The Marriage of Mr. Mississippi, which was entered into the 11th Berlin International Film Festival.

She is the daughter of a German soldier, Gustav Freiherr von Koczian-Miskolczy (1877, Brünn1958, Oberndorf,) and his wife Lydia Alexandra. After a brief marriage with film director Dietrich Haugk which ended in divorce in 1961, Johanna von Koczian was married to music producer Wolf Kabitzky, who died in July 2004. She is the mother of German actress Alexandra von Koczian.

Selected filmography

 Victor and Victoria (1957)
  (1958)
 Aren't We Wonderful? (1958)
 People in the Net (1959)
 For the First Time (1959)
 Jacqueline (1959)
 Adorable Arabella (1959)
  (1960)
 Stage Fright (1960)
 Agatha, Stop That Murdering! (1960)
 The Marriage of Mr. Mississippi (1961)
 Our House in Cameroon (1961)
 Street of Temptation (1962)
 Who Wants to Sleep? (1965)
  (1969, TV series, 6 episodes)
  (1975, TV series, 13 episodes)
 Derrick - Season 2, Episode 08: "Pfandhaus" (1975)
 Derrick - Season 3, Episode 05: "Schock" (1976)
 Single Bells  (1997)

References

External links
 

1933 births
Living people
20th-century German actresses
21st-century German actresses
German film actresses
German stage actresses
German television actresses
German expatriates in Austria
German people of Hungarian descent
Barons of Germany
Barons of Austria
Hungarian nobility
Moravian nobility
Austrian nobility
Actors from Salzburg